Chattonella is a genus of marine raphidophytes associated with red tides. A technique using monoclonal antibodies can be used to identify the genus, while the RAPD reaction can be used to distinguish between different species within the genus.  It includes the species Chattonella antiqua, a bloom forming alga responsible for large scale fish deaths due to the synthesis of toxic compounds related to brevetoxin.

References 

Heterokont genera
Ochrophyta